The 1950 Notre Dame Fighting Irish football team represented the University of Notre Dame during the 1950 college football season.  The Irish, coached by Frank Leahy during his eighth year at Notre Dame, ended the season with 4 wins, 4 losses, and one tie.  Though they were ranked #1 in the preseason AP Poll and were the defending National Champions, the 1950 team– without Heisman Trophy-winner Leon Hart, who had graduated in the spring and was drafted by the NFL's Detroit Lions with the first overall pick– only achieved a .500 record for the season.

Schedule

Team players drafted into the NFL

The following players were drafted into professional football following the season:
 Bob Williams was the 2nd pick in the first round.

References

Notre Dame
Notre Dame Fighting Irish football seasons
Notre Dame Fighting Irish football